Orávka is a village and municipality in the Rimavská Sobota District of the Banská Bystrica Region of southern Slovakia. Village is located ca. 15 km southeast from district capital Rimavská Sobota. In Orávka is train stop, public library, foodstuff store and a pub. Main village dominant is a church from 1995.

References

External links
 
 
https://web.archive.org/web/20160804140255/http://oravka.e-obce.sk/

Villages and municipalities in Rimavská Sobota District